Tyrants of the Rising Sun  is a DVD+CD set of Arch Enemy, released in Europe on 23 November 2008 and in North America on 25 November 2008 via Century Media. The DVD contains a live show filmed in Tokyo in early 2008, an in-depth 40 minute road-movie feature, and all promotional videos that have been shot for the band's seventh studio album, Rise of the Tyrant.

The DVD is available in the following versions: Deluxe edition DVD+2CDs, Standard DVD, Standard 2CDs, ltd EPs.

Track listing

DVD
Tokyo Forum (8 March 2008)

Intro / Blood On Your Hands (M. Amott/C. Amott/A. Gossow) (5:37)
Ravenous (M. Amott/C. Amott/A. Gossow)(3:55)
Taking Back My Soul (M. Amott/D. Erlandsson/C. Amott/A. Gossow) (5:16)
Dead Eyes See No Future (M. Amott/C. Amott/A. Gossow) (4:22)
Dark Insanity (M. Amott/J. Liiva) (3:59)
The Day You Died (M. Amott/D. Erlandsson/A. Gossow) (4:55)
Christopher Solo (C. Amott) (2:32)
Silverwing (M. Amott/C. Amott) (5:26)
Night Falls Fast (M. Amott/A. Gossow) (3:37)
Daniel Solo (D. Erlansson) (3:30)
Burning Angel (M. Amott/C. Amott)(4:40)
Michael Amott Solo (incl. "Intermezzo Liberté") (M. Amott) (3:24)
Dead Bury Their Dead (M. Amott) (4:57)
Vultures (M. Amott/C. Amott/A. Gossow) (6:51)
Enemy Within (M. Amott/C. Amott/A. Gossow) (4:29)
Snowbound (M. Amott/C. Amott) (2:14)
Shadows And Dust (M. Amott/D. Erlandsson/C. Amott) (5:12)
Nemesis (M. Amott/D. Erlandsson/C. Amott/A. Gossow) (5:04)
We Will Rise (M. Amott/C. Amott) (4:33)
Fields Of Desolation (M. Amott/C. Amott/J. Liiva)/Enter the Machine (M. Amott/D. Erlandsson/C. Amott) (tape) (4:33)

Special Features
 The Road To Japan (Interviews / Road Movie) (approx. 45 minutes)

Promo videos
 "Revolution Begins" (Original Version) (4:24)
 "Revolution Begins" (Band Performance Version) (4:14)
 "I Will Live Again" (3:34)

CD
Disc One
Intro / Blood On Your Hands (5:37)
Ravenous (3:55)
Taking Back My Soul (5:16)
Dead Eyes See No Future (4:22)
Dark Insanity (3:59)
The Day You Died (4:55)
Christopher Solo (2:32)
Silverwing (5:26)
Night Falls Fast (3:37)
Daniel Solo (3:30)

Disc Two
Burning Angel (4:40)
Michael Amott Solo (incl. "Intermezzo Liberté") (3:24)
Dead Bury Their Dead (4:57)
Vultures (6:51)
Enemy Within (4:29)
Snowbound (2:14)
Shadows And Dust (5:12)
Nemesis (5:04)
We Will Rise (4:33)
Fields Of Desolation / Outro (3:14)
Enter the Machine (tape)

Personnel 
Angela Nathalie Gossow - Vocals
Michael Amott - Guitar, backing vocals
Christopher Amott - Guitar
Sharlee D'Angelo - Bass
Daniel Erlandsson - Drums

References

External links
 Tyrants of the Rising Sun album at Encyclopaedia Metallum
 Tyrants of the Rising Sun DVD at Encyclopaedia Metallum

Arch Enemy albums
2008 video albums
Live video albums
2008 live albums
Century Media Records live albums
Century Media Records video albums